Hou Yingli (born 15 August 1978) is a Chinese synchronized swimmer who competed in both the 2000 and 2004 Summer Olympics. Yingli emigrated to Canada in 2006 and now works as the head coach for the Waterloo Regional Synchronized Swimming Club.

References

External links
 Waterloo Regional Synchronized Swimming Club

1978 births
Living people
Chinese synchronized swimmers
Olympic synchronized swimmers of China
Sportspeople from Nantong
Synchronized swimmers at the 2000 Summer Olympics
Synchronized swimmers at the 2004 Summer Olympics
Synchronized swimmers from Jiangsu
Nanjing Sport Institute alumni